William Heymann (26 October 1885 — 27 November 1969) was an English cricketer. He was a right-handed batsman and a left-arm medium pace bowler who played for Nottinghamshire. He was born in Nottingham and died in Long Clawson.

Heymann made a single first-class appearance, during the 1905 season, against Middlesex. As a lower order batsman, Heymann did not bat during the match, the team declaring their only innings after centuries from Arthur Jones and George Gunn. He bowled 23 overs during the match, taking two wickets.

External links
William Heymann at Cricket Archive

1885 births
1969 deaths
English cricketers
Nottinghamshire cricketers
Cricketers from Nottingham
People educated at Haileybury and Imperial Service College